Shatter is an EP by Swiss extreme metal band Triptykon, released on 25 October 2010. The EP consists of the bonus track "Shatter" from the Japanese edition of Eparistera Daimones, as well as other songs from the recording sessions of that album, including a newly mastered version of their demo "Crucifixus". Tracks 4 and 5 are live versions of Celtic Frost songs, recorded during Triptykon's headliner performance at the Roadburn Festival in Tilburg, The Netherlands, on 16 April 2010. "Dethroned Emperor" features guest lead vocals by Nocturno Culto (Darkthrone, Sarke).

Release 
Shatter has been released in multiple formats, such as a CD, a 12" vinyl, and a digital download. A music video for the song "Shatter" was also released.

Track listing

Personnel 
 Thomas Gabriel Fischer – vocals, guitar, programming
 V. Santura – guitar, vocals
 Norman Lonhard – drums, percussion
 Vanja Slajh – bass, backing vocals

Guest musicians 
 Simone Vollenweider – vocals on "Shatter"
 Nadine Rimlinger – violin on "I am the Twilight"
 A. Acanthus Gristle – vocals on "Crucifixus"
 Nocturno Culto – vocals on "Dethroned Emperor"

References

External links 
 Official Triptykon website
 Delineation II (Thomas Fischer's blog)

2010 EPs
Black metal EPs
Triptykon albums